Kristin Butcher is a Canadian writer and reviewer of young adult and juvenile fiction. She was born in Winnipeg, but moved to Victoria, BC, at the age of 5. Her first novel, The Runaways, was published in 1997 and went on to be a regional Silver Birch Award winner. Since then she has published 25 other books, including two biographies for primary readers and 10 titles in the successful Soundings and Currents series from Orca Books, of which Zee’s Way and Zack & Zoe Bully and the Beagle won the 2006 and 2011 Chocolate Lily Awards, respectively. She has twice toured for the Canadian Children's Book Week and given book talks at libraries and schools. Butcher is also an artist and illustrator. Butcher started as a teacher in Victoria and two years previous to that, she had met her husband Rob Butcher.

Bibliography

A list of Kristin Butcher's books:

 The Runaways (1997)
 The Tomorrow Tunnel (1999)
 The Gramma War (2001)
 Summer of Suspense (2002)
 Cairo Kelly and The Mann (2002)
 The Hemingway Tradition (2002)
 The Trouble with Liberty (2003) — Translated into German
 Zee's Way (2004) — Translated into Slovenian and Spanish
 Chat Room (2006)
 Zach & Zoe and the Bank Robber (2008)
 Zach & Zoe Bully and the Beagle (2009)
 Return to Bone Tree Hill (2009)
 Pharaohs & Foot Soldiers (2009) — Translated into Korean
 Zach & Zoe and the River Rescue (2011)
 Cheat (2011)
 The Last Superhero (2010)
 Truths I Learned from Sam (2013)
 Caching In (2013) — Translated into Swedish
 Cabin Girl (2014)
 Alibi (2015)
 In Search of Sam (2015)
 Winter Road (2017)
 Isobel’s Stanley Cup (2018)

References

External links
 Official web site

Canadian children's writers
Living people
Writers from Winnipeg
1951 births
Canadian women children's writers